Abduwahap Aniwar (born 14 May 2000) is a Chinese footballer currently playing as a midfielder for Kunshan.

Club career
Abduwahap Aniwar would play for the Guangzhou youth team before he joined second tier club Kunshan on 23 July 2020. He would go on to make his debut in a league game on 16 September 2020 against Nantong Zhiyun in a 0-0 draw. This would be followed by his first goal for the club in a league game on 25 September 2021 against Beijing BIT in a 4-0 victory. He would go on to establish himself as regular within the team and was part of the squad that won the division and promotion to the top tier at the end of the 2022 China League One campaign.

Career statistics
.

Honours

Club 
Kunshan
 China League One: 2022

References

External links
Abduwahap Aniwar at Worldfootball.net

2000 births
Living people
Chinese footballers
Association football midfielders
China League One players
Guangzhou F.C. players
Kunshan F.C. players
21st-century Chinese people